Afghana or Avagana  is a tribal chief or prince of Pashtuns, who is traditionally considered the progenitor of modern-day Pashtuns, the largest ethnic group in Afghanistan and second largest in Pakistan. The ethnonym "Afghan" is believed to derive from his name. One of the earliest mention of the word Afghan is by Shapur I of the Sassanid Empire during the 3rd century CE, in documents found in Northern Afghanistan.

House of King Saul 

According to the Tanakh, King Saul (Talut) was the son of Kish, a member of the tribe of Benjamin, one of the twelve Tribes of Israel. Saul married Ahinoam, daughter of Ahimaaz and had four sons and two daughters.  The sons were Jonathan, Abinadab, Malchishua, Ish-bosheth, Ishvi, Armani, Irmia, and Mephibosheth. Saul's daughters were named Merab and Michal. Historians and Pashtun lore describes Malak Afghana as the son of Irmia (Jeremiah) and grandson of King Saul (Talut).

This name is mentioned in the form of Afghan in the 3rd century CE by the Sassanians and as Avagana in the 6th century CE by Indian astronomer Varahamihira.

It is mentioned that Afghana was brought up by King David at a young age. When Solomon became king, Afghana was made commander-in-chief of the army. Malak Afghana is also credited with the building of the first temple in Jerusalem, the Temple Mount, known later in Arabic as the Haram al-Sharif (al-haram al-qudsī ash-sharīf):

According to Tadhkirat al-Muluk, Malak Afghana migrated to the place known as Takht-i-Sulaiman and generations later Qais Abdur Rashid, a descendant of Malak Afghana, embraced Islam.

Death

According to legend, after his death he was buried in what is now Zhob Sulaiman Mountains in Pakistan. In other folklore however, Qais Abdur Rashid in his old age, when he felt his time was near, asked his sons to bury him in the vicinity of Zhob (Sulaiman Mountains) at the location where his ancestor Afghana was buried.

See also
 Nimat Allah al-Harawi author of Tarikh-i-Khan Jahani Makhzan-i-Afghani also known as The History of the Afghans
 Ten Lost Tribes

References

External links
 Shariat and Tasawwuf
 The Legendary Qais Abdur Rashid
 Pashtun clue to lost tribes of Israel: Genetic study sets out to uncover if there is a 2,700-year-old link to Afghanistan and Pakistan
 Pashtun Bani Israelite Origins
 Hebrew Pashtun Article 1
 Hebrew Pashtun Article 2
 Alden Oreck, The Virtual Jewish History Tour: Afghanistan from Jewish Virtual Library

Pashtun people
Pashtun tribes
Legendary progenitors
Afghan Jews
Jewish royalty